Emmanuel Yeboah may refer to:

Emmanuel Yeboah (cyclist), Ghanaian cyclist, triathlete, and disability rights activist
Emmanuel Yeboah (sprinter), Ghanaian sprinter
Emmanuel Yeboah (footballer), Ghanaian footballer